The Near Northside Historic District is a historic district in Columbus, Ohio. The large district encompasses portions of the University District, Harrison West, and nearly all of Victorian Village.

Description
The district was listed on the National Register of Historic Places in 1980. The district is made up of about 70 square blocks, with houses developed generally between 1870 and 1920. Architectural styles range from Italianate to Second Empire, Eastlake, Romanesque Revival, and Shingle Style, with some vernacular buildings as well. District boundaries overlap with the city's Victorian Village Historic District.

The First Avenue School, on the Columbus Register of Historic Properties, also lies within this district.

Gallery

See also
 National Register of Historic Places listings in Columbus, Ohio

References

External links
 

National Register of Historic Places in Columbus, Ohio
Historic districts on the National Register of Historic Places in Ohio
1980 establishments in Ohio
Historic districts in Columbus, Ohio